Thomas Edwin Greenfield Ransom (November 29, 1834 – October 29, 1864) was a surveyor, civil engineer, real estate speculator, and a general in the Union Army during the American Civil War.

Biography
Ransom was born in Norwich, Vermont, son of Colonel Truman B. Ransom, who was killed in action at the Battle of Chapultepec during the Mexican–American War, when the younger Ransom was only 14 years old. The father was remembered by a participant in that battle, Adjutant General Richard Coulter Drum of the Regular Army, as "by all odds the most brilliant man under fire I have ever seen." His son, Thomas, entered Norwich University in 1848, where he remained three years.  After graduating in 1851 he went to Illinois, where he engaged in civil engineering and real estate speculation. He initially lived with his uncle, George Gilson, then mayor of Peru, an Illinois River town in LaSalle County. Ransom was known as the "boy surveyor" of LaSalle County. During that period, he was joined by his close friend and fellow Norwich University graduate, Grenville M. Dodge, who would later win fame as a Civil War general and the chief engineer of the Union Pacific Railroad.

As the Civil War began, Ransom was in the employ of the Illinois Central Railroad, living in Fayette County.

In response to President Abraham Lincoln's call for troops in 1861, Ransom raised a body of soldiers that became Company E of the 11th Illinois Infantry, and was elected its captain on April 6, 1861, then major on June 4. He was commissioned lieutenant colonel of the regiment July 30, and colonel on February 15, 1862. He was commissioned brigadier general on November 9, 1862, and in  January 1863, took command of a brigade in Brigadier General John McArthur's Sixth Division of McPherson's XVII Corps.

Ransom was wounded four times: in a skirmish near Charleston, Missouri, on August 20, 1861; at the Fort Donelson in February 1862; severely (in the head) during the Battle of Shiloh on April 6, 1862; and at the Battle of Sabine Cross Roads, Louisiana, on April 4, 1864. His wounds at the latter engagement were so severe that he was evacuated to Chicago for treatment.

At various times, he commanded divisions of XIII, XVI and XVII Corps. He led XVII Corps in the pursuit of a Confederate force through North Georgia into Alabama. Returning to Georgia in October, he was taken severely ill with dysentery, but remained in command and on the field until too weak to go further. When told that he had but a few hours to live, he answered: "I am not afraid to die, I have met death too often to be afraid of it now."

He was awarded a brevet (honorary promotion) to major general on September 1, 1864 and died in service a few weeks later.

Burial
General Ransom is buried in Rosehill Cemetery in Chicago.

Ransom's memory was cherished by many prominent Union Generals including Grant and Sherman. The historian Edward G. Longacre notes that the stoic Grant wept upon hearing of young Ransom's death. Ransom's close friend, Grenville Dodge, recalled how, even years later, President Grant would frequently talk about young Ransom with great affection and respect. Sherman kept a photograph of General Ransom on the wall of his office 20 years after the war. After his death, the community of Ransom, Illinois, was named in his honor.

See also

List of American Civil War generals (Union)

Notes

References
 Benedict, G. G., Vermont in the Civil War. A History of the part taken by the Vermont Soldiers And Sailors in the War For The Union, 1861-5. Burlington, VT.: The Free Press Association, 1888, ii:789.
 Goddard, M. E. and Henry V. Partrigde, A History of Norwich Vermont, Hanover, NH: Dartmouth Press, 1905, pp. 242–3.
 Peck, Theodore S., compiler, Revised Roster of Vermont Volunteers and lists of Vermonters Who Served in the Army and Navy of the United States During the War of the Rebellion, 1861-66. Montpelier, VT.: Press of the Watchman Publishing Co., 1892, pp. 729, 739.

Further reading
 Huffstodt, Jim. Hard dying men: the story of General W. H. L. Wallace, General T. E. G. Ransom, and their "Old Eleventh" Illinois Infantry in the American Civil War (1861–1865), Bowie, MD: Heritage Books, 1991.
 W. T. Sherman, General W. T. The Vermont Boy Who Volunteered in 1861, Served Bravely, was Wounded Grievously, and Died for the Union, Eulogy of General T.E.G. Ransom given before Ransom Post No. 131, Grand Army of the Republic (GAR), St. Louis, Missouri, June 20, 1884,'' Washington National Tribune, June 1884.

External links

1884 eulogy by General William Tecumseh Sherman at dedication of Ransom Post 131, Department of Missouri, Grand Army of the Republic

Photograph of his gravestone
Ransom Family Genealogy
U.S. Army Military History Institute Bibliography
General Thomas Edwin Greenfield Ransom historical marker in Rome, Georgia
 

1834 births
1864 deaths
Burials at Rosehill Cemetery
People from Chicago
People from Norwich, Vermont
People of Illinois in the American Civil War
People of Vermont in the American Civil War
Union Army generals
Norwich University alumni
Deaths from dysentery